Morley Charles Roberts (29 December 1857 – 8 June 1942) was an English novelist and short story writer, best known for The Private Life of Henry Maitland.

Life and work
Roberts was born in London, the son of William Henry Roberts (1831-1908), a superintending inspector of income tax, and Catherine, née Pullen. He was educated at Bedford Grammar School, and Owens College, Manchester, England.

Near the end of 1876 Roberts took a steerage passage to Australia and landed at Melbourne in January 1877. The next three years were spent in obtaining colonial experience, mostly on sheep stations in New South Wales, and Roberts then returned to London. For a time he worked in the war office and other government departments, but again went on his travels and had varied occupations in the United States and Canada between 1884 and 1886. He later travelled in Oceania, Australia, South Africa, amongst other parts of the world.

Roberts used his experiences freely in his books, the first being The Western Avernus (1887), a travelogue taking place in North America. While it was his most successful publication, his portrayals of Indigenous and Chinese people were marred by racism. Roberts began his long series of novels and short stories in 1890. Of his novels, Rachel Marr (1903) was highly praised by William Henry Hudson. His novel Prey of the Strongest (1906), was the first accurate depiction of British Columbia mills, woods, and gambling halls. The Private Life of Henry Maitland (1912), based on the life of George Gissing the novelist, was one of his most important works. Roberts also wrote essays, biography, drama and verse, and did some competent work in biology. He married Alice, daughter of the playwright Angiolo Robson Slous, and died in London aged 84 on 8 June 1942.

He was only a few years in Australia, but there are many Australian references both in his novels and his short stories. Storm Jameson, who wrote a short biography of Roberts in 1961, considered Time and Thomas Waring to be his best novel. An exhaustive bibliography by Markus Neacey of his novels and other writings and writings about him can be found in the July 2012 number of English Literature in Transition. Roberts has featured in several articles in The Gissing Journal. Victorian Secrets have published a scholarly edition of the Selected Stories of Morley Roberts (Brighton: Victorian Secrets, 2015), edited with an introduction by Markus Neacey.

Bibliography

The Western Avernus, or, Toil and Travel in further North America (1887)
Land-travel and Sea-Faring (1891)
Songs of Energy (1891)
The Mate of the Vancouver (1892)
The Degradation of Geoffrey Alwith (1895)
The Adventures of a Ship's Doctor (1897)
Maurice Quain (1897)
The Adventure of the Broad Arrow; an Australian Romance (1897)
Lord Linlithgow : a Novel (1900)
The Plunderers : a Romance (1900)
The Way of Man : a Romance (1902)
Rachel Marr (1903)
A Tramp's Note-book (1904)
The Wingless Psyche (1904)
Lady Penelope (1905)
The Idlers (1906)
The Prey of the Strongest (1906)
Flying Cloud (1907)
David Bran (1908)
The Private Life of Henry Maitland (1912)
Time and Thomas Waring (1914)
Hearts of Women; a Study of a Group (1920)
W. H. Hudson, a Portrait (1924)

Short Stories include:
The Reputation of George Saxon and other Stories (1891)
King Billy of Ballarat and Other Stories, Lawrence & Bullen (London), 1892 (including: "Father and Son")
Red Earth, Lawrence & Bullen (London), 1894 (including: "Wide Bay Bar".)
The Keeper of the Waters, Skeffington & Son (London), 1898 (including: "The Anticipator".)
The Promotion Of The Admiral And Other Sea Comedies, J Eveleigh Nash (London), 1903 (including: "The Scuttling Of The Pandora")
Midsummer Madness, Eveleigh Nash (London), 1909 (including: "The Blood Fetish")

Nonfiction:
Warfare in the Human Body: Essays on Method, Malignity, Repair and Allied Subjects (1920)
Malignancy and Evolution: a Biological Enquiry into the Nature and Causes of Cancer (1926, 1934)
Bio-Politics: An Essay in the Physiology, Pathology and Politics of the Social and Somatic Organism (1938)
Behaviour of Nations: An Essay in the Conduct of National Organisms in the Nutritional Field (1941)

References

External links
 
 
 
 Read Chapter 1 of The Adventure of the Broad Arrow from the Lost Worlds Australia Anthology.
 
 Bibliography of works by Morley Roberts at Freeread
 Morley Roberts Papers, Ms. coll. 726. University of Pennsylvania: Rare Book & Manuscript Library.
Archival Material at 

19th-century English novelists
20th-century English novelists
English short story writers
English science fiction writers
1857 births
1942 deaths
People educated at Bedford School
English male short story writers
English male novelists
19th-century British short story writers
19th-century English male writers
20th-century British short story writers
20th-century English male writers
English male non-fiction writers